The bigeye barracuda (Sphyraena forsteri) is a species of the family Sphyraenidae, which can be found in Indo-West Pacific oceans.

References 

Sphyraenidae
Taxa named by Georges Cuvier
Fish described in 1829
Fish of the Pacific Ocean